Percy William Hale (7 February 1874 – 8 January 1933) was an English first-class cricketer active 1900 who played for Middlesex. He was born in Kensington; died in Harrow, Middlesex.

References

1874 births
1933 deaths
English cricketers
Middlesex cricketers